Catatia is a genus of flowering plants in the family Asteraceae.

 Species
Both known species are endemic to Madagascar.
 Catatia attenuata Humbert
 Catatia cordata Humbert

References

Gnaphalieae
Asteraceae genera
Endemic flora of Madagascar
Taxa named by Jean-Henri Humbert